The Goldklang Group is a sports ownership and management group. Led by Marvin Goldklang, the group includes Jeff Goldklang, Bill Murray, Mike Veeck, and Tom Whaley. The Goldklang Group has interests in the Charleston RiverDogs of Low-A East, the Pittsfield Suns of the Futures Collegiate Baseball League, and the St. Paul Saints, formerly of the American Association and as of 2021, a member of Triple-A East in Minor League Baseball (MiLB). The Fort Myers Miracle of the Florida State League, now known as the Fort Myers Mighty Mussels, was the group's first MiLB team and was sold to SJS Beacon in April 2014.

They formerly owned the Hudson Valley Renegades of High-A East before selling the team in 2021 to Endeavor Group Holdings. 

Tyler Tumminia served as Senior Vice President of the group from 2011 to 2016.

References

External links
 

Entertainment companies of the United States

American companies established in 1989